Angga railway station  is a station on the Chinese Qingzang Railway.

See also
 Qingzang Railway
 List of stations on Qingzang railway

References

Railway stations in Tibet
Stations on the Qinghai–Tibet Railway